Othniel (ʿOṯnīʾēl ben Qenaz) was the first of the biblical judges. The etymology of his name is uncertain, but may mean "God/He is my strength" or "God has helped me".

Family
The Hebrew Bible refers to Othniel as "Othniel the son of Kenaz, the brother of Caleb". The expression is inconclusive in Hebrew, and has been taken to mean either that Othniel himself was the brother of Caleb, or that Othniel's father Kenaz was the brother of Caleb.

The Talmud argues that Othniel was Caleb's brother.

When Caleb promises the hand of his daughter Achsah to whoever conquers the land of Debir, it is Othniel who rises to the challenge, thus becoming Caleb's son-in-law.

Campaign as a Judge
The historical reality of events described in the Book of Judges is the subject of ongoing dispute among scholars, who vary in their opinions about how much of the book is historical. As to the story of Othniel in particular, biblical scholar Marc Zvi Brettler states, "The Ehud and Othniel stories contain clues that they are not meant to be read as depictions of the real past."

According to the biblical account, some time after the death of Joshua, the Israelites once again turned to sin and fell under the subjection of Chushan-rishathaim, the king of Aram-Naharaim in Mesopotamia, because of the transgressions against God.  Chushan-rishathaim oppressed them for eight years; when they "cried" unto God, Othniel was raised up to be their deliverer. He is the only Judge mentioned connected with the Tribe of Judah. Under Othniel, peace lasted for forty years.

After these forty years, Israel fell under the subjection of Eglon, a king of Moab who defeated Israel with help from Ammon and Amalek.

Burial site
A tomb traditionally regarded as belonging to Othniel Ben Knaz is located in Hebron in a traditional burial cave. Located approximately 200 meters west of the Beit Hadassah building, it has been revered as a site for prayers for generations.

The structure of the tomb corresponds to the way Jewish burial sites were made in the times of the Mishnah, as a family burial cave with compartments in the sides.

Menachem Mendel of Kamenitz, the first hotelier in the Land of Israel references his visit to the Tomb of Othniel in his 1839 book Sefer Korot Ha-Itim. He states, "outside of the city [of Hebron] I went to the grave of Othniel ben Kenaz and, next to him, are laid to rest 9 students  this  in niches in the wall of a shelter standing in a vineyard. I gave 20 pa’res to the owner of the vineyard."

The author and traveler J. J. Benjamin mentioned visiting the tomb in his 1859 book Eight Years in Asia and Africa. He states, "Likewise outside the city, towards the south, in a vineyard, which was purchased by the Jews, are the graves of the father of King David and of the first Judge, Othniel, the son of Kinah."

In recent years prayer services have been organized for the holiday of Lag BaOmer and for Tisha B'Av.

See also
Biblical Judges
Book of Judges

References

External links
 Book of Judges article of the Jewish Encyclopedia
 Reference to Othniel in the Book of Judges full text from Chabad
 Reference to Othniel in the Book of Judges full text from Mechon-Mamre
 Tomb of Othniel page on Hebron.com
 Video of visit to Tomb of Othniel in 2011
 Video of visit to Tomb of Othniel in 2013
 Photos of Tomb of Othniel from old Hebron website
 Photos of Tomb of Othniel from Hebron Fund website
 Photos and information on Tomb of Othniel from Shavei Hevron website

Judges of ancient Israel
Tribe of Judah